Scopula sublinearia is a moth of the  family Geometridae. It is found in Australia (Queensland), the Louisiade Archipelago and Fiji.

Subspecies
Scopula sublinearia sublinearia (Australia)
Scopula sublinearia ida Robinson, 1975 (Fiji)
Scopula sublinearia massimensis Prout, 1938 (Louisiade Archipelago)

References

Moths described in 1866
sublinearia
Moths of Oceania